The Paralympic Committee of India (PCI) is the body responsible for selecting athletes to represent India at the Paralympic Games and other international athletic meets and for managing the Indian teams at the events.

The organisation was founded in 1992 as the Physically Handicapped Sports Federation of India.

History
In 1992, M. Mahadeva along with others started an organization at national level for the promotion and development of sports for the physically challenged and deifferently-abled people, Physically Handicapped Sports Federation of India. It was registered in 1994 with the registrar of co-operative societies, Bangalore, Karnataka. Its first President was Rathan Singh. The objectives of this organization were to promote sports for the disabled in India. Its aims included: identifying disabled athletes throughout India, imparting necessary training to them and preparing them to take part in State, National and International Sports meets.

The organization affiliated itself to the International Paralympic Committee, as well as the International Wheelchair and Amputee Sports Federation; the FESPIC Federation, covering countries in the Far East and South Pacific regions; and the Asian Paralympic Committee.

The Paralympic Committee of India was given public authority status by the RTI Act of 2005.

Aims and objectives
 To promote and contribute to the development of sport opportunities and competitions, from the start to elite level.
 To develop opportunities for athletes with a severe disability in sport at all levels and in all structures.
 To promote the self-governance of each Paralympic sport federation as an integral part of the national sport movement, whilst at all times safeguarding and preserving its own identity.
 To ensure the spirit of fair play prevails, the health risk of the athletes is managed and fundamental ethical principles are upheld.

Events

87 Indian Para Athletes participate at the India at the 2014 Asian Para Games in 17th Asian Games Incheon 2014 Official Album.

101 Indian athletes participated at the 2010 Asian Para Games in Guangzhou, China.

See also
Indian Olympic Association
India at the Paralympics
 Indian Children's Games

References

External links
Official website
Paralympic athlete is left stranded at Delhi airport, Daily News and Analysis, 24 December 2010
Athletes handicapped by red-tapism, MiD DAY, 11 June 2010

Parasports organizations
India Paralympic committee
Sports governing bodies in India
Disability organisations based in India
1992 establishments in Karnataka
Sports organizations established in 1992
Organisations based in Bangalore